The Blanco River is a river of Guatemala.

See also
List of rivers of Guatemala

References
Mapa de Cuencas y Ríos (INSIVUMEH)
Principales ríos de Guatemala (INSIVUMEH)

Rand McNally, The New International Atlas, 1993.
CIA map: :Image:Guatemala geopolitical.jpg
UN map: :Image:Un-guatemala.png

Rivers of Guatemala